Matthew Brandon Sarmento (born June 23, 1991) is a Canadian male field hockey player, who plays as a forward for the Canadian national team.

Club career
Sarmento played in Canada for the Victoria Vikes and the UBC Thunderbirds. In 2017 he went to Europe to play for KHC Leuven in Belgium.

International career
Sarmento competed at the 2015 Pan American Games and won a silver medal.

In 2016, he was named to Canada's Olympic team. He made his World Cup debut at the 2018 World Cup, where he played in all four games.

In June 2021, Sarmento was named to Canada's 2020 Summer Olympics team.

References

External links
 
 
 
 
 

1991 births
Living people
Canadian male field hockey players
Male field hockey forwards
Field hockey players at the 2015 Pan American Games
Field hockey players at the 2016 Summer Olympics
Field hockey players at the 2020 Summer Olympics
2018 Men's Hockey World Cup players
Pan American Games silver medalists for Canada
Canadian people of Portuguese descent
Olympic field hockey players of Canada
Pan American Games medalists in field hockey
Field hockey players from Vancouver
KHC Leuven players
Men's Belgian Hockey League players
Medalists at the 2015 Pan American Games
20th-century Canadian people
21st-century Canadian people